Villa Hidalgo Yalalag (also, Yalalag, Hidalgo Yalag, and Villa Hidalgo Yalalag, and San Juan Yalalag) is a village in Oaxaca, Mexico and the municipal seat of Villa Hidalgo Municipality.
It is located near Villa Alta District in the center of the Sierra Norte Region.

The town is divided into four neighborhoods (in Spanish called "barrios").  These 4 barrios are: San Juan, Santiago, Santa Catalina, and Santa Rosa.

Culture

On August 30 and July 24, in honor of San Juan Bautista, the townspeople of Villa Hidalgo Yalalag celebrate their annual festival, with popular dancing, processions, and offerings.

Traditions
Traditions include Semana Santa and Todos los Santos.

Music
Popular bands in Villa Hidalgo Yalalag are "Banda Uken ke Uken" and "Los Ratones.

In art 
Mexican photographer Lola Álvarez Bravo's photograph Burial in Yalalag (1946) was included in the 1955 Museum of Modern Art exhibition Family of Man, which toured internationally during the 1950s and 1960s, with her image reaching millions of viewers.

See also 
Yalálag Zapotec

References

Populated places in Oaxaca